Sharda Nand was   an Indian politician.  He was elected to the Lok Sabha, the lower house of the Parliament of India from the Sitapur, Uttar Pradesh as a member of the Bharatiya Jana Sangh.

References

External links
  Official Biographical Sketch in Lok Sabha Website

Bharatiya Jana Sangh politicians
Possibly living people
Year of birth missing
India MPs 1967–1970